The American Idols Live! Tour 2014 was a concert tour that featured the Top 10 finalists of the 13th season of American Idol. The tour started on June 24, 2014, in Binghamton, New York and ended on August 23, 2014, in Redmond, Washington.

The size of the venues for this American Idol tour was smaller compared to previous years. The show scheduled for Albany, New York was canceled and the show in Syracuse was moved to a smaller venue.  Unlike previous years, there was no live band, and the finalists performed to a backing track.

Dexter Roberts left the tour after appearing in only a few shows due to illness.

Performers

Additional notes
Dexter Roberts did not appear in the show from July 1 onward. Later it was reported that he had left the tour by mutual agreement, and Roberts revealed that he was suffering from Rocky Mountain spotted fever he contracted from tick bites during a turkey hunt in Kentucky he attended soon after the thirteenth-season finale.

Setlist
 "Counting Stars" by OneRepublic – Group
 "Fuckin' Perfect" by Pink – MK Nobilette with Malaya Watson and Jessica Meuse as backup
 "Tightrope" by Janelle Monáe – Majesty Rose with Jena Irene, Watson, and Meuse as backup
 "Cruise" by Florida Georgia Line – C.J. Harris and Dexter Roberts (C.J. Harris and Meuse after Roberts' departure)
 "When I Was Your Man" by Bruno Mars – Watson
 "Wake Me Up" by Avicii – Nobilette, Rose and Watson
 "Let Her Go" by Passenger – Alex Preston and Sam Woolf
 "Keep Your Hands to Yourself" by The Georgia Satellites – Roberts (dropped from the setlist after Roberts' departure)
 "Muckalee Creek Water" by Luke Bryan – Roberts (dropped from the setlist after Roberts' departure)
 "Pompeii" by Bastille – Preston with Harris and Woolf as backup
 "Gimme Shelter" by The Rolling Stones – Irene and Caleb Johnson
 "Gravity" by John Mayer – Harris with Preston as backup
 "American Woman" by The Guess Who – Harris with Irene, Meuse, and Preston on backup
 "Happy" by Pharrell Williams – Group

Intermission
 "Best Day of My Life" by American Authors and "Story of My Life" by One Direction – Group
 "We Are One" – Irene with Rose and Meuse
 "Can't Help Falling in Love" by Elvis Presley – Irene
 "My Body" by Young the Giant – Irene
 "Lego House" by Ed Sheeran – Woolf
 "Sail Away" by David Gray – Woolf
 "You and I" by Lady Gaga – Meuse with Irene, Rose and Watson on backup
 "Pumped Up Kicks" by Foster the People – Meuse with Rose and Woolf on backup
 "Fairytale" (Alex Preston) – Preston
 "Too Close" by Alex Clare – Preston
 "Family Tree" by Kings of Leon – Johnson
 "Maybe I'm Amazed" by Paul McCartney – Johnson with Rose, Watson and Woolf on backup
 "As Long As You Love Me" – Johnson with the girls on backup
 "Dazed and Confused" by Led Zeppelin – Johnson
 "Radioactive" by Imagine Dragons – Finale

Tour dates

References

External links

American Idol concert tours
2014 concert tours